Potiskum is the largest city among all the 17 local government Areas of Yobe state in terms of human population and businesses transactions. It's located on latitude 11˚43'N and longitude 11˚04'E.

Wards 
The following are the 10 wards in Potiskum Local Government Area:

 Bolewa 'A'
 Bolewa 'B'
 Dogo Nini Ward
 Dogo Tebo Wardaa
 Danchuwa/Bula
 Mamudo
 Hausawa
 Ngojin/Alaraba
 Bare-bare/Bauya/Lailai Dumbulwa
10. Yerimaram/Garin Daye/Badejo/Nahuta

External Links 
Nigerian Post Office, with a map of LGAs of the state

References 

wards